All in My Love for You is an album by Jimmy Sturr and His Orchestra. In 1990, the album won Sturr the Grammy Award for Best Polka Recording.

See also
 Polka in the United States of America

References

Grammy Award for Best Polka Album
Jimmy Sturr albums